Callidora is a genus of parasitoid wasps belonging to the family Ichneumonidae and the subfamily Campopleginae. It is relatively species poor, with only five recognized species.

The genus has an almost cosmopolitan distribution.

Description
Much like in other Campopleginae is the metasoma laterally compressed and the tip of the ovipositor notched. Clypeus small, mandibles and cheeks short. Eyes bare. Spurs hind tibiae reach the middle of the first segment of hind tarsus. Areola on propodeum small, hexagonal but open behind. Areolet of the wings present, second recurrent vein leaving near its middle. Nervellus intercepted. First tergite with a very weak glymma. Females of some species have a distinctive white ring on the antennae. Head and thorax black, metasoma usually red with black markings.

Species

 Callidora albovincta  (Holmgren, 1860)
 Callidora analis  (Gravenhorst, 1829)
 Callidora atrognatha  Gupta & Gupta, 1977
 Callidora surata  Tigner, 1969
 Callidora tegularis  Tigner, 1969

References

Ichneumonidae
Ichneumonidae genera